Condylonucula maya is a tiny species of saltwater clam, a marine bivalve mollusk or micromollusk in the family Nuculidae, the nut clams. It is found in shallow waters in the Caribbean Sea off the coast of Mexico.

References

Nuculidae
Bivalves described in 1977